Swift Bird Creek is a stream in the U.S. state of South Dakota.

Swift Bird Creek has the name of Chief Swift Bird, a member of the Sioux tribe.

See also
List of rivers of South Dakota

References

Rivers of Dewey County, South Dakota
Rivers of South Dakota